Lianxi Road is an interchange station on Line 13 and  Line 18 of the Shanghai Metro. Located at Lianxi Road and Lüke Road in Pudong, Shanghai, the station opened on 30 December 2018 with the opening of the phases 2 and 3 extensions of Line 13. It became an interchange station with the opening of the remainder of phase one of Line 18 on 30 December 2021. Although this segment of Line 18 was originally scheduled to open by the end of 2020, the opening date has been delayed to late 2021.

Station layout

References 

Railway stations in Shanghai
Shanghai Metro stations in Pudong
Railway stations in China opened in 2018
Line 13, Shanghai Metro
Line 18, Shanghai Metro